Real Thing is the debut studio album by Canadian country music group The Higgins. It was released on June 24, 2008 by Open Road. The first single, "Flower Child," was released in March 2008. "Flower Child" received the "Single of the Year", "SOCAN Song of the Year", and "Video of the Year" Awards at the 32nd Annual BCCMA Award Ceremony.

Track listing

Chart performance

Singles

References

2008 debut albums
Open Road Recordings albums
The Higgins albums